Nanny Simon (born 23 June 1931) is a Dutch gymnast. She competed in seven events at the 1952 Summer Olympics.

References

External links
 

1931 births
Living people
Dutch female artistic gymnasts
Olympic gymnasts of the Netherlands
Gymnasts at the 1952 Summer Olympics
Gymnasts from Amsterdam